Christmas Jars is a Canadian television film, directed by Jonathan Wright and released in 2019. Based on the 2005 novel by Jason F. Wright, the film stars Jeni Ross as Hope Jensen, a journalist investigating a phenomenon of jars of money being anonymously left on the doorsteps of needy families as Christmas gifts.

The film's cast also includes Markian Tarasiuk as Hope's love interest Ian Maxwell.

The film was shot near Ottawa in early 2019. It premiered in December 2019 on BYUtv in the United States, and Citytv in Canada.

The film won the Canadian Screen Award for Best TV Movie at the 9th Canadian Screen Awards in 2021. Ross and Tarasiuk received nominations for Best Performance in a Television Movie, and Andrea Stevens was nominated for Best Writing in a TV Movie.

See also
 List of Christmas films

References

External links

2019 films
2019 television films
2010s Christmas drama films
Canadian Christmas drama films
English-language Canadian films
Films based on American novels
Christmas television films
Gemini and Canadian Screen Award for Best Television Film or Miniseries winners
Films shot in Ottawa
Films directed by Jonathan Wright (director)
2010s English-language films
2010s Canadian films